The Workers' Party is a communist party in Tunisia. Legalized only in 2011, it participates in the Popular Front coalition, which is represented in the Assembly of the Representatives of the People. The party's long-term leader is general secretary Hamma Hammami.

Founded in 1986, the party was known as the Tunisian Workers' Communist Party (PCOT) until 2012. After the rename it remained a member of the Hoxhaist International Conference of Marxist–Leninist Parties and Organizations (Unity & Struggle).

History
The party was outlawed until the Tunisian Revolution, when in a failed attempt to shore up the state framework it and another banned parties were invited to participate in a national unity government. Subsequently, the party and other opposition elements refused this attempt to co-opt the ongoing revolution by installing a government composed at its senior levels by associates of the former regime.

It was founded on 3 January 1986 and has a youth wing the Union of Communist Youth of Tunisia (UJCT).

Amnesty International reports that in 1998 five students were charged with belonging to PCOT and given 4-year prison sentences after student demonstrations.

After their involvement in the uprising against Zine El Abidine Ben Ali, PCOT held their first conference as a legal party on 22–24 July, with up to 2000 attending. Removing the word "communist" from the party's name was among the topics debated. In the end, party spokesperson Abed Jabbar Bdouri stated the party decided "not to make any changes since we're currently too busy with the electoral campaign".

In the 2011 Constituent Assembly election, the candidates of PCOT's electoral formation ran by the name "Revolutionary Alternative" and won 3 of the 217 seats, in Sfax, Kairouan and Siliana. Member Chrif Khraief has stated the party was dissatisfied with the result, as "3 seats in the CA doesn't reflect at all the real weight of the party on the streets"; PCOT issued a statement condemning the use of political donations and electoral violations during the campaign.

In July 2012, the PCOT decided to remove the word "communist" from its name to avoid the stereotype associated with this term.

References

External links

"Let Us Make the Awakening of the Movement our Central Task," La Forge: Organ of the Communist Party of the Workers of France (April 1997) (Document released on PCOT's 11th anniversary).
"Interview with Hamma Hammani on the situation in Tunisia," La Forge: Organ of the Communist Party of the Workers of France (September 1997).
Hamma Hammami, Tunisian Communist Workers Party, "Tunisia: For a Constitutional Assembly to Lay the Foundations of a Democratic Republic," (Tunisia, 15 January 2011). [Retrieved from MRZine 28 January 2011].

1986 establishments in Tunisia
Arab nationalism in Tunisia
Arab socialist political parties
Communist parties in Tunisia
Formerly banned communist parties
Formerly banned political parties in Tunisia
Hoxhaist parties
International Conference of Marxist–Leninist Parties and Organizations (Unity & Struggle)
Pan-Arabist political parties
Political parties established in 1986
Popular Front (Tunisia)